Earle Smith was an American football player and coach. He served as the head football coach at Spring Hill College in Mobile, Alabama from 1938 to 1939 and in 1941. Smith played college football at the University of Alabama. He was the brother of Ben Smith, who played in the National Football League (NFL).

Head coaching record

References

Year of birth missing
Year of death missing
American football ends
Alabama Crimson Tide football players
Spring Hill Badgers football coaches